Collis P. Huntington High School, commonly referred to as just Huntington High School (opened in 1927) was a black high school located in the East End section of Newport News, Virginia, USA during the era of racial segregation.  After desegregation, it became an integrated intermediate school (eighth and ninth grades), and in 1981 was converted to a middle school (sixth through eighth grades).  The school was named after the shipping and railroad pioneer, Collis P. Huntington, who founded the local shipyards, the Newport News Shipbuilding & Dry Dock Company, at one time the largest shipbuilding concern in the world.

Lutrelle Palmer, the principal of Huntington High, also a strong NAACP advocate, whose own wages were supplemented by voluntary parental contributions, in November 1937 chastised his daughter for accepting a job in Newport News that paid her a third less per month than a beginning white teacher earned.  This led to a unanimous vote by the Virginia State Teachers Association to file equal-pay lawsuits in partnership with the NAACP.  This move paved the way to a statewide campaign attacking the legal basis for school segregation.  Palmer was sacked from the school in 1943 for his activism.

Huntington's football team, coached by Thad Madden from 1943 through 1971, had 28 straight winning seasons, compiling a 251-114-16 record.  Madden's Huntington teams won sixteen Virginia Interscholastic Association eastern District titles and seven VIA state championships.  Huntington track and field squads, also under Madden, won 19 VIA state championships and were declared seven times runners-up after the VIA integrated with the Virginia High School League.

Notable alumni

 Joe Durham, Former MLB player (Baltimore Orioles. St. Louis Cardinals) 
 Former U.S. Energy Secretary, Hazel R. O'Leary (1937-)
 Thaddeus E. Hayes, founder of Thaddeus Hayes Dance Theatre (ca. 1928-April 26, 2000)

References

External links
  No Easy Journey, on Huntington's role in the campaign against segregation, Newport News, Va., Daily Press, republished in Newsday.
 Thad Madden, biography from Virginia Sports Hall of Fame and Museum; biography from Athletic Hall of Fame of the Lower Virginia Peninsula.
 Walter Nathaniel Ridley
 Hazel O'Leary
 HR0188 (92nd General Assembly, Illinois) honoring Lu Palmer.
 Huntington Middle School

Historically segregated African-American schools in Virginia
Huntington High
Huntington High
Huntington High
1927 establishments in Virginia
1981 disestablishments in Virginia